French election 2012 may refer to:

 2012 French presidential election
 2012 French legislative election